Minuscule 670 (in the Gregory-Aland numbering), ε 1186 (von Soden), is a Greek minuscule manuscript of the New Testament, on parchment. Palaeographically it has been assigned to the 11th or 12th century. The manuscript is very lacunose. Scrivener labelled it by 901e.

Description
The codex contains the text of the Gospel of Luke 8:3-24; 9:13-34, on only 2 parchment leaves (size ). The text is written in one column per page, 26 lines per page.

Text
The Greek text of the codex Kurt Aland did not place in any Category.

It was not examined by using the Claremont Profile Method.

The textual character of the codex can not be determined because it is a fragmentary condition.

History
Gregory dated it to the 11th or 12th century. Currently the manuscript is dated by the INTF to the 11th or 12th century.

The manuscript was brought to America in 1844 from Crete, by George Benton (along with Minuscule 669). Formerly it belonged to La Crescenta/California, W.-L. Hall-Benton.

The manuscript was examined by Harris and Clark.

Currently the manuscript belongs to a private collection. Officially its owner is unknown.

See also

 List of New Testament minuscules
 Biblical manuscript
 Textual criticism
 Minuscule 671

References

Further reading
 K. W. Clark, A Descriptive Catalogue of Greek New Testament Manuscripts in America (Chicago, 1937), pp. 10–11
 J. Rendel Harris, Sunday School Times (Philadelphia, 4 June 1887), p. 355.

Greek New Testament minuscules
11th-century biblical manuscripts
Lost biblical manuscripts